Inge Persson (born 1 October 1940) is a Swedish former footballer who played as a midfielder, best known for representing Hammarby IF.

Club career
Persson was born in Stockholm and started to play football as a youngster with local club IFK Hammarbyhöjden in the Swedish lower divisions. He moved to Hammarby IF in 1958 and made his senior debut the same year. It was not until 1961 that Persson established himself in the first team, at age 20.

He soon got known as an elegant playmaker with great heading skills. On 21 September 1967, Persson scored a brace for Hammarby against rivals AIK in a 3–1 home win, a game that he is remembered for among fans of the club.

Persson was regularly the captain of Hammarby and played eleven seasons with the club in Allsvenskan, plus five seasons in the second tier Division 2. In total, Persson made 189 league appearances and scored 22 goals.

Being injury prone throughout his whole career, Persson retired at the end of 1973, aged 33.

International career
Persson won his first and only cap for Sweden in a 2–1 win against Thailand, in an away friendly on 16 November 1962. Together with teammate Gösta Lundell, he was called up by the former Hammarby coach Lennart Nyman who had been appointed manager of the national team the same year.

References

External links

1940 births
Living people
Footballers from Stockholm
Swedish footballers
Association football midfielders
Allsvenskan players
Hammarby Fotboll players
Sweden international footballers
Sweden under-21 international footballers